Munnodi is a 2017 Tamil-language masala film directed by SPTA Kumar and starring Harish and Yamini Bhaskar in the lead roles with Malayalam actor Sijoy Varghese and Arjuna in pivotal roles. It received negative reviews upon its release.

Cast 
Harish as Sathya
Yamini Bhaskar as Denuka
Sijoy Varghese as Soundarapandian 
Ranjith Velayudhan as Mandhiramoorthy 
Pavel Navageethan as Jayaveeran 
Sithara as Sathya's mother
Suja Varunee

Production  
Telugu actors Harish and Yamini Bhaskar are making their Tamil debut in this film.  Malayalam actor Sijoy Varghese was chosen for the role of a police officer after the makers watched Varghese in Avatharam and appreciated him for the role. The film was shot in Chennai, Madhrai, Tirunelveli and Thoothukudi. Arjuna, who appeared in Tamil and Telugu films was signed to play one of the three main leads alongside Harish and Varghese.

Soundtrack  
The songs were composed by K Prabu Shankar.
 "Akkam Pakkam" - Sooraj Santhosh, Remya Nambeesan

Reception  
The Deccan Chronicle wrote that "The movie starts off with an interesting note, loses its sheen due to the lackluster romantic track and the clichéd friends gang who does the routine thing of boozing, dancing and helping the hero out in his love life". The Times of India wrote that "The actors, too, are very artificial and the director's writing lets him and his movie down".

References  

2010s Tamil-language films
2017 films